S. Krishnamoorthy is an Indian politician and former Member of the Legislative Assembly of Tamil Nadu. He was elected to the Tamil Nadu legislative assembly as a Dravida Munnetra Kazhagam candidate from Nellikuppam constituency in 1989 election.
Previously he was elected to the Tamil Nadu legislative assembly as an Anna Dravida Munnetra Kazhagam candidate from Andimadam constituency in 1980 election he has called as nellikuppam krishnamoorthy by his followers.

References 

Dravida Munnetra Kazhagam politicians
Living people
Year of birth missing (living people)